XHRCV-FM is a community radio station on 107.9 FM in San Antonino Castillo Velasco, Oaxaca. It is known as Radio Calenda, La Voz del Valle.

History
With roots dating back to 1997, Radio Calenda signed on the air on 104.5 MHz on September 15, 2001. On April 22, 2005, XHRCV-FM 107.9 was permitted.

References

Radio stations in Oaxaca
Community radio stations in Mexico
Radio stations established in 2001